Ephippiger terrestris, common name Alpine saddle-backed bush-cricket,  is a bush cricket species belonging to the family Tettigoniidae, subfamily Bradyporinae.

Subspecies
Subspecies include:
 Ephippiger terrestris bormansi Brunner von Wattenwyl, 1882 (in Italy and Switzerland)
 Ephippiger terrestris caprai Nadig, 1980 (in Italy)
 Ephippiger terrestris terrestris Yersin, 1854

Distribution
This species is present in Middle and Southwestern Europe (France, Italy and Switzerland). The subspecies E. terrestris bormansi occurs only in northern Italy and southern Switzerland.

Habitat

Description

These bush crickets are usually bluish-green. However, in both sexes the body color is quite variable and often olive-green, beige and sepia-brown color variations occur. A yellowish line runs from the lower edge of the pronotum to the abdomen end. Two bright longitudinal lines run along the back sides.

The back of the head is black. The form of the pronotum is rather smooth and gently concave and resembles a saddle (the Latin name ephippium means 'saddle of a horse'). They have round small atrophied wings, protruding a few millimeters below the pronotum, that are unfit to flight and only used for the emission of sounds (stridulation). In the females the ovipositor is long and slightly curved upwards. In the male cerci stand out clearly and are cylindrical and relatively long.

Biology
Adults can be found from July to October. The larvae go through about 5 stages. These bush crickets are omnivorous. Both the male and the female can produce sounds, even if the female does so rarely and only in response to other males.

Bibliography
 Eades D.C., Otte D., Cigliano M.M., Braun H., Orthoptera Species File. 
Bellmann & Luquet (1995), Guide des sauterelles, grillons et criquets d'Europe occidentale, Delachaux et Niestle, Lausanne 1-383 
Fontana, La Greca & Kleukers. 2006. In Ruffo & Stoch. Checklist and distribution of the Italian fauna 2 17:137-139
Massa, Fontana, Buzzetti, Kleukers & Odé. 2012. Fauna d'Italia. Orthoptera 48:302
Yersin (1854), Bull. Soc. Vaudoise Sc. nat. 4

References

External links 
 Grasshoppers of Europe
 INPN

terrestris
Insects described in 1854
Orthoptera of Europe